MacUser was a monthly computer magazine published by Ziff Davis in the United States, while the UK edition was published by Dennis Publishing.

History and profile
MacUser started publication in late 1985 as a four-color monthly and contained general interest Mac articles. In 1986 the magazine was acquired by Ziff Davis. It had reviews and regular columns for novice and experienced users with a more humorous view of the Macintosh world than other publications of the time. Games were reviewed and well as business and productivity software. A unique feature, not available in other publications, was the inclusion of about 250 capsule reviews in each edition.

The initial cover price was $3.50 with an annual subscription of $23 per year or $42 for two-years.

In 1997, the publication was absorbed into Macworld as Macworld, incorporating MacUser (a name reflected subtly on the magazine's Table of Contents page) reflecting a consolidation of the Ziff Davis-owned MacUser magazine into the International Data Group-owned Macworld within the new Mac Publishing joint venture between the two publishers.

See also
 MacUser

References

Monthly magazines published in the United States
Defunct computer magazines published in the United States
Magazines established in 1985
Magazines disestablished in 1997
Macintosh magazines
1985 establishments in the United States